Schizomeria is a genus with 10 species of plants in the family Cunoniaceae. There are two species in Australia. Others occur in New Guinea, the Moluccas and the Solomon Islands. The fruit is a fleshy drupe.

The name is from the Greek, meaning I cut a portion of. Referring to the petals which appear as if parts have been cut from the petal tips.

Selected species
Schizomeria ovata

References

Cunoniaceae
Oxalidales genera